Mohamed Moustafa Abou Elela (born 25 June 1980) is an Egyptian wrestler. He competed in the 2000 Summer Olympics.

References

External links
 

1980 births
Living people
Wrestlers at the 2000 Summer Olympics
Egyptian male sport wrestlers
Olympic wrestlers of Egypt